Cần Thơ, also written as Can Tho or Cantho , is the fourth-largest city in Vietnam, and the largest city along the Mekong Delta region in Vietnam.

It is noted for its floating markets, rice paper-making village, and picturesque rural canals. It has a population of around 1,282,300 as of 2018, and is located on the south bank of the Hậu River, a distributary of the Mekong River. In 2007, about 50 people died when the Cần Thơ Bridge collapsed, causing Vietnam's worst engineering disaster. In 2011, Cần Thơ International Airport opened.

History 
During the Vietnam War, Cần Thơ was the home of the ARVN IV Corps capital. The ARVN 21st division was dedicated to protect the city of Cần Thơ, including the provinces of Chương Thiện (now in Hậu Giang), Bạc Liêu, An Xuyen (Cà Mau), Ba Xuyen (Soc Trang), and Kiên Giang. Before 1975, Cần Thơ was part of Phong Dinh province. On November 1, 1955, the third Light Division changed into the thirteenth Light Division, and the fifteenth, twelfth, and 106th regiments transformed into the 37th, 38th, and 39th regiments. The 37th and 38th Regiments consisted of battalions that originated in the present MR 3. The 39th regiment consisted of battalions from My Tho and Sa Dec in the Delta. The 39th Regiment participated in the successful campaigns against dissidents in Hua Hau in 1955–1956.

Administrative system
The city is an independent municipality at the same level as the other provinces of Vietnam. It was created in the beginning of 2004 by a split of the former Cần Thơ Province into two new administrative units: Cần Thơ City and Hậu Giang Province.

Cần Thơ is subdivided into nine district-level sub-divisions:

 5 urban districts:
 Bình Thủy
 Cái Răng
 Ninh Kiều
 Ô Môn
 Thốt Nốt

 4 rural districts:
 Cờ Đỏ
 Phong Điền
 Thới Lai
 Vĩnh Thạnh

They are further subdivided into five commune-level towns (or townlets), 36 communes, and 44 wards.

Ninh Kiều, which has the well-known Ninh Kiều port, is the central district and also the most populated and wealthiest of these districts.

The city borders the provinces of An Giang, Hậu Giang, Kiên Giang, Vĩnh Long and Đồng Tháp.

Transportation

Before 1975, National Highway 4 (now National Route 1) bypassed the ferry from Binh Minh, VL to Cần Thơ where the ARVN 21st division patrolled heavily the ferry transportation to protect the civilians and ship merchants. South of the National Highway 4 from Cần Thơ to Ba Xuyen province (Soc Trang) were mainly heavily patrolled by ARVN soldiers to prevent route disruption.

Today, Cần Thơ is connected to the rest of the country by National Route 1A and Cần Thơ International Airport. The city's bridge, which is now completed, is the longest cable-stayed bridge in Southeast Asia. The six-lane Saigon–Cần Thơ Expressway is being built in parts  from Hồ Chí Minh City to Mỹ Tho. Hydrofoil express boats link this city with Hồ Chí Minh City. From Phú Quốc island, tourists can use the ferry, passenger bus or taxi to transfer to Cần Thơ. There are many vehicles such as taxis, Grab motorbikes, buses, vans and coaches.

Tourism

The Mekong Delta is considered to be the "rice basket of Vietnam", contributing more than half of the nation's rice production. People say of Cần Thơ:

Cần Thơ (shared with Hau Giang) is famous for its floating markets, especially Cai Rang Floating Market, where people sell and buy things on the river, as well as the bird gardens and the port of Ninh Kiều. The city offers a wide range of tropical fruits such as pomelo, longan, jackfruit, mango, guava, banana, rambutan, mangosteen, dragon fruit and durian. The Cần Thơ City Museum has exhibits on the city's history.

Tourist attractions:
 Cần Thơ Bridge
 Thiền viện Trúc Lâm Phương Nam (Buddhist temple)
 Nam Nhã Pagoda
 Bình Thủy Temple
 The historic Bình Thủy house (1870): a mix of French and Asian architecture
 Ninh Kiều Quay
 Cần Thơ pedestrian bridge
 Cái Răng Floating Market & Phong Điền Floating Market
 Bằng Lăng Stork Sanctuary (Thốt Nốt district)
 Canal tour
 Cần Thơ Cathedral
 Ông Chinese Pagoda
 Pitu Khôsa Răngsây Khmer Pagoda
 Quang Đức Pagoda
 Long Quang Pagoda
 Lưu Hữu Phước Park
 Phật Học Pagoda
 Mỹ Khánh tourist village
 Cần Thơ seminary

Education
Academic institutions in the city are Cần Thơ University, Cần Thơ Department of Education and Training, Cần Thơ University of Medicine and Pharmacy, Tây Đô University, Nam Cần Thơ University, Cần Thơ College, College of Foreign Economic Relations – Cần Thơ Branch, Medical College, Singapore International School at Can Tho, Cần Thơ Technical Economic College and Vocational College, with its well-known College of Agriculture and Mekong Delta Rice Research Institute, Cần Thơ University of Technology.

Climate
Under the Köppen climate classification, Cần Thơ has a tropical wet and dry climate. Cần Thơ's climate features two seasons: rainy (from May to November) and dry (from December to April). Average annual humidity is 83%, rainfall  and temperature .

Economy

After 120 years of development, the city now is the delta's most important center of economics, culture, science, and technology. It has a large freshwater port and two industrial parks.

Twin towns – sister cities

 Kaposvár Hungary
 Riverside, United States
 Shantou, China

Notable people
Lưu Hữu Phước (1921–1989), composer
Nguyễn Huỳnh Kim Duyên (born 1995), beauty queen and model, 2nd Runner-up Miss Supranational 2022
Lana Condor (born 1997), actress
Lê Nguyễn Bảo Ngọc (born 2001), beauty queen and model,  Miss Intercontinental 2022

Gallery

References

External links
 
 

 
Cities in Vietnam
Mekong Delta
Populated places in Cần Thơ
Populated places on the Mekong River